Tomb KV28 is an ancient Egyptian tomb located in the Valley of the Kings in the Theban Necropolis in Upper Egypt. It was first excavated by persons unknown, and excavation in the 1990s led by Donald P. Ryan found the bones of three individuals, fragments of a limestone canopic jar, numerous wooden fragments, and early to mid Eighteenth Dynasty pottery.  The occupants were possibly nobles, given the tomb's proximity to the tomb of Thutmose IV.

References

Reeves, N & Wilkinson, R.H. The Complete Valley of the Kings, 1996, Thames and Hudson, London
Siliotti, A. Guide to the Valley of the Kings and to the Theban Necropolises and Temples, 1996, A.A. Gaddis, Cairo

External links
Theban Mapping Project: KV28 includes detailed maps of most of the tombs.

Valley of the Kings